Vistonida is a former municipality in the Xanthi regional unit, East Macedonia and Thrace, Greece. It was named after Lake Vistonida. Since the 2011 local government reform it is part of the municipality Abdera, of which it is a municipal unit. The municipal unit has an area of 159.524 km2. Population 10,435 (2011). The seat of the municipality was the town Genisea.

References

Populated places in Xanthi (regional unit)

el:Δήμος Αβδήρων#Ενότητα Βιστωνίδας